Haarlemmermeer is a municipality in the west of the Netherlands, in the province of North Holland. Haarlemmermeer is a polder, consisting of land reclaimed from water. The name Haarlemmermeer means 'Haarlem's lake', referring to the body of water from which the region was reclaimed in the 19th century.

Haarlemmermeer's main town is Hoofddorp, which has a population of 76,660. Hoofddorp, along with the rapidly growing towns of Nieuw-Vennep and Badhoevedorp, are part of the Randstad agglomeration. The main international airport of the Netherlands, Schiphol, is located in Haarlemmermeer.

History

The original Haarlemmermeer lake is said to have been mostly a peat bog, a relic of a northern arm of the Rhine which passed through the district in Roman times.

The four lakes were formed into one by successive floods with the Haarlemmermeer name being applied to the combined lake. Villages disappeared in the process. One of those villages was Vennep, after which the modern Nieuw-Vennep was named. In Dutch, the tendency for lakes to grow over time is called the waterwolf. During the Dutch War of Independence, the waters of the Haarlemmermeer were the scene of the Battle of Haarlemmermeer, a naval engagement between a Spanish fleet and the ships of the Dutch rebels known as "Sea Beggars", who were trying to break the Siege of Haarlem.

The Haarlemmermeer could be a dangerous place during storms. It claimed a famous victim on 7 January 1629, when Frederick Henry of the Palatinate, son and heir of Frederick V, the "Winter King" drowned trying to cross it.

In 1643, Jan Adriaanszoon Leeghwater proposed to dike and drain the lake. Similar schemes, among which those of Nicolaus Samuel Cruquius in 1742 and of Baron van Lijnden van Hemmen in 1820 are worthy of special mention, were brought forward from time to time. But it was not until a furious hurricane in November 1836 drove the waters as far as the gates of Amsterdam, and another on Christmas Day sent them in the opposite direction to submerge the streets of Leiden, that the mind of the nation was seriously turned to the matter.

On 1 August 1837, King William I appointed a royal commission of inquiry; the scheme proposed by the commission received the sanction of the Dutch Parliament's Second Chamber in March 1839, and in the following May the work was begun.

First, a canal was dug around the lake, called Ringvaart (Ring Canal), to carry the water drainage and boat and ship traffic which had previously gone across the lake. As the water had no natural drainage, it was calculated that probably 1000 million tons of water would have to be raised by mechanical means.

All of the pumping was done by steam mills, an innovation contrasting with the historic practice of draining polders using windmills. Three Cornish beam engines were imported from Hayle: the Leeghwater, the Cruquius (the largest Watt-design reciprocal stroke steam engine ever built and now a museum), and the Lijnden. Pumping began in 1848, and the lake was dry by July 1, 1852; 800 million tons of water were actually discharged. At the first sale of the highest lands along the banks on 16 August 1853, about £28 per acre was paid; but the average price afterwards was less. The whole area of  recovered from the waters brought in 9,400,000 guilders, or about £780,000, exactly covering the cost of the enterprise; so that the actual cost to the nation was only the amount of the interest on the capital, or about £368,000.

The soil is of various kinds, loam, clay, sand, and peat. Most of it is fertile enough, though in the lower portions there are barren patches where the scanty vegetation is covered with an ochreous deposit. Mineral springs occur containing a very high percentage (3.245 grams per litre) of common salt; and in 1893 a company was formed to work them.

In 1854, the city of Leiden laid claim to the possession of the new territory, but the courts decided in favor of the nation. Haarlemmermeer became incorporated as a municipality in the province of North Holland by law on 16 July 1855. Its first mayor was Matthijs Samuel Petrus Pabst. The first church was built in the same year and by 1877 there were seven. By 1860 its population was 7237, and 40 years later in 1900, it was 16,621.

Initially agriculture dominated in Haarlemmermeer. But with 99% of the land owned by a few wealthy land owners, poor harvests and low commodity prices, life was very difficult for the tenant farmers. After 1900, the situation improved when commodity prices rose and most farmers owned their own land. Then greenhouse farming developed. Seasonal labourers, attracted by good pay, boosted the population by settling in the villages along the Ringvaart. Maize, seeds, cattle, butter, and cheese were the principal produce. Today, large industrial and office developments have become prominent, especially at Hoofddorp and Schiphol.

The roads which traverse the commune are bordered by pleasant-looking farmhouses built after the various styles of Holland, Friesland and Brabant, reflecting the various origins of the farmers. Hoofddorp, Venneperdorp or Nieuw-Vennep, Abbenes, and the vicinities of the pumping stations are the spots where the population has clustered most densely.

In 1917 a military airport was built near the old fort of Schiphol. Nowadays, Schiphol Airport is the major civilian aviation hub in the Netherlands, using 15% of Haarlemmermeer's land area. In 1926, Amsterdam's municipal council took over the management of Schiphol. After Stockholm's airport, Schiphol was the second airport in Europe to have hardened runways, in 1937–1938. The name Schiphol means "ship hole" and refers to the many ships lost due to storms in the former lake.

In the first half of the 20th century, a number of steam railway lines were built in Haarlemmermeer; most were abandoned only a couple of decades later. On 1 January 2019, the municipality of Haarlemmerliede en Spaarnwoude merged with Haarlemmermeer.

Population centres
The municipality of Haarlemmermeer contains the following cities, towns and villages: Aalsmeerderbrug, Abbenes, Badhoevedorp, Beinsdorp, Boesingheliede, Buitenkaag, Burgerveen, Cruquius, De Hoek, Haarlemmerliede, Halfweg, Hoofddorp, 't Kabel, Leimuiderbrug, Lijnden, Lisserbroek, Nieuwe Meer, Nieuwebrug, Nieuw-Vennep, Oude Meer, Penningsveer, Rijsenhout, Schiphol, Schiphol-Rijk, Spaarndam (partly), Spaarnwoude, Vijfhuizen, Vinkebrug, Weteringbrug, Zwaanshoek, Zwanenburg.

Monuments and parks

 Stelling van Amsterdam – the old defense line of Amsterdam crosses the Haarlemmermeer. Plans are being made to make this entire defense line walkable, but currently it is not possible to cross the major highway A4 that goes through it. This park is accessible at various points for recreation, including the Haarlemmermeer Woods.
 Haarlemmermeer Woods (Dutch: 'Haarlemmermeerse Bos') – the largest public park in Haarlemmermeer and site of the International garden show Floriade 2002, the park includes a large lake for swimming in the summer and a 40-meter manmade hill called Spotter's Hill. The Haarlemmermeer Woods is home to events such as horse shows and the Mysteryland music festival.
 Museum De Cruquius – the Cruquius museum resides in one of the steam mills used to pump the Haarlemmermeer dry and is open to the public for a demonstration of the steam engine and a model of the Netherlands waterways and polders. Because the Cruquius steam engine is the largest ever built, the museum is an Anchor Point of ERIH, The European Route of Industrial Heritage. Behind the museum is a park.

Economy

Four airlines, TUI fly Netherlands, KLM Cityhopper, Martinair, and Transavia have their headquarters on the grounds of Schiphol Airport in Haarlemmermeer. The airline alliance SkyTeam has its offices in the World Trade Center Schiphol building on the grounds of Schiphol Airport. Schiphol Group, which operates the airport, has its head office on the airport property. Iran Air has its Netherlands sales office in the World Trade Center building. Nippon Cargo Airlines has its Europe regional offices there as well. Corendon Dutch Airlines has its head office in Lijnden, Haarlemmermeer. Lijnden also has the Amsterdam branch office of Corendon Airlines.

Also, the international organization representing air navigation service providers (air traffic controllers), Civil Air Navigation Services Organisation (CANSO) has its headquarters in Schiphol Airport.

At one time KLM had its head office on the grounds of Schiphol Airport. Its current head office in Amstelveen had a scheduled completion at the end of 1970. When Air Holland existed, its head office was in Oude Meer, Haarlemmermeer. At one time NLM CityHopper had its head office at the airport.

Transportation

Roadways
One of the busiest freeways in the Netherlands, the A4 from Amsterdam to Den Haag, crosses right through Haarlemmermeer. Other freeways are the A5, from Hoofddorp to Amsterdam Sloterdijk, A9 from Alkmaar to Diemen and the A44, from Nieuw-Vennep to Wassenaar.

Calatrava bridges

In the presence of HM Queen Beatrix in 2004 three bridges designed by the Spanish architect Santiago Calatrava were opened. The bridges span the main canal of the Haarlemmermeer and are named after three string instruments; Harp, Cittern, and Lute.
Unfortunately, in 2006 two of those bridges' structures already displayed clear signs of corrosion. All the bridges are currently being repaired.

Aviation

Amsterdam Airport Schiphol, the principal international airport of the Netherlands is also situated in Haarlemmermeer. Its destinations are worldwide.

Railway

Nederlandse Spoorwegen, the Dutch National Railways, serves the municipality with three stations: Hoofddorp, Nieuw-Vennep, and Schiphol Airport (which serves high speed rail as well).

There was a network of local steam railways across Harlemmermeer in the early 20th century, the Haarlemmermeer railway lines.

Water transport

The Ringvaart is an important waterway for commercial and recreational boats alike. A portion of it forms part of the sailroute from Hollands Diep to the IJsselmeer, passable for ships with masts over 6 meters tall. There is also a connection to the Kaag Lake system (Kagerplassen), which extends to Leiden and beyond.

There are several canals within Haarlemmermeer itself, the main ones are Hoofdvaart (Main Canal) and Kruisvaart (Cross Canal). But these had initially no connection to the outside waterways, meaning that goods had to be reloaded at the ring dike. In 1895 a double canal lock was built at Aalsmeer, boosting the economy. In the 1950s this lock was closed and the canals are once again no longer used for shipping.

Government

Local government

The municipal council of Haarlemmermeer consists of 39 seats, which are in 2014 divided as follows:
 VVD – 7 seats
 HAP Haarlemmermeer – 7 seats
 CDA – 5 seats
 Forza! Nederland - 5 seats
 Groenlinks – 4 seats
 D66 – 3 seats
 PvdA – 3 seats
 ChristenUnie/SGP – 2 seats
 Een Haarlemmermeer - 1 seat
 Gezond Haarlemmermeer - 1 seat
 SRH - 1 seat

National government
The Netherlands Aviation Safety Board, during its existence, had its head office in Hoofddorp in Haarlemmermeer. The Dutch Transport Safety Board, the successor agency, was established on 1 July 1999 and the Netherlands Aviation Safety Board was merged into the agency at that time.

International relations

Twin towns — sister cities
The following cities have a sister city relationship with the Haarlemmermeer municipality: 

To honour the relationship, three structures in Hoofddorp are named after the sister cities: The Cebu Citybridge and the Hódmezővásárhely fountain.

Notable people 

 Hendrikus Colijn (1869 in Burgerveen – 1944) a Dutch politician, Prime Minister of the Netherlands 1925/1926 & 1933/1939 
 Gerrit Verkuyl (1872 in Haarlemmermeer – 1967) a New Testament Greek scholar and Bible Translator in the US
 Machiel van den Heuvel (1900 in Haarlemmermeer – 1946) a Dutch army officer and Escape Officer for the Dutch POWs in Oflag IV-C at Colditz Castle
 Arnold Meijer (1905 in Haarlemmermeer – 1965) a Dutch fascist politician
 Tom Gehrels (1925 in Haarlemmermeer – 2011) a Dutch–American astronomer and academic
 Jan van Houwelingen (1939 in Leerdam – 2013) a Dutch politician, Mayor of Haarlemmermeer 1994/2003
 Tineke Netelenbos (born 1944 in Wormerveer) a retired Dutch politician, Mayor of Haarlemmermeer 2006/7 
 Rick van der Linden (1946 in Badhoevedorp - 2006) a Dutch composer and keyboardist
 Jacob Wit (born 1952 in Haarlemmermeer) a justice of the Caribbean Court of Justice located in Trinidad and Tobago
 Sonja van Driel (born 1959 in Haarlemmermeer) a Dutch photographer 
 Cas Jansen (born 1977 in Badhoevedorp) a Dutch actor

Sport 
 Dirk van Foreest (1862 in Haarlemmermeer – 1956) a Dutch chess master
 Arnold van Foreest (1863 in Haarlemmermeer – 1954) a Dutch chess master
 Fanny Blankers-Koen (1918 in Lage Vuursche – 2004) a Dutch track and field athlete, won four gold medals at the 1948 Summer Olympics
 Daphne Jongejans (born 1965 in Badhoevedorp) a retired female diver, participated in three consecutive Summer Olympics: 1984, 1988 and 1992
 Hennie Dompeling (born 1966 in Haarlemmermeer) a Dutch sport shooter, competed in skeet shooting at five Olympics (1988 to 2004)
 Edwin Jongejans (born 1966 in Amstelveen) a retired diver, competed at the 1988 and 1992 Olympics
 Joop Stokkel (born 1967 in Aalsmeerderbrug) a Dutch Paralympian and leading equestrian
 Michiel Bartman (born 1967 in Badhoevedorp) a former rower, gold medallist at the 1996 Summer Olympics and silver medallist in the 2000 and 2004 Summer Olympics
 Marcel Keizer (born 1969 in Badhoevedorp) a Dutch football coach currently with Sporting CP and former player
 Robert van Boxel (born 1983 in Zwanenburg) a professional footballer, over 250 club caps
 Renate Jansen (born 1990 in Abbenes) a Dutch female international footballer

References

 Garritsen, A.M. Pyttersen's nederlandse almanak. , 1998.

External links

  

 
Municipalities of North Holland
Former lakes of the Netherlands
Polders of North Holland